Marina Shafir (Moldovan Cyrillic: Марина Шафир; born 14 April 1988) is a Moldovan professional wrestler and former mixed martial artist currently signed to All Elite Wrestling (AEW). She formerly competed for Invicta Fighting Championships in the women's featherweight division. Shafir is best known for her time in WWE, where she was the first and to date only Moldovan to ever compete for that promotion.

Early life 
Shafir moved from Moldova to the United States when she was five years old. Her father, a mechanic, and her mother, a teacher, settled in New York along with Marina and her two older brothers. Shafir began training judo when she was six years old and started competing at a high level in the sport when she was 12. However, she stopped competing in judo in her late teens.

Mixed martial arts career 
Shafir began her mixed martial career at an amateur level in 2012. In a two year spell, she was unbeaten, winning all five of her matches by submission (four by armbar and one by arm-triangle choke). She turned professional in early 2014.

Shafir's first professional fight was against Chandra Engel on April 12, 2014, where she won by submission in the first round. Later that year, Shafir suffered her first-ever loss in a first-round defeat to Amanda Bell. The following year, she signed with Invicta Fighting Championships. Her first match in the Invicta promotion was against Amber Leibrock on July 9, 2015, which was Leibrock's first professional fight. Shafir was defeated in the first round.

Professional wrestling career

WWE (2018–2021)
On May 7, 2018, WWE announced that Shafir, along with Jessamyn Duke, had signed with WWE and reported to their Performance Center for training. On October 28 at WWE Evolution, Shafir and Duke made their WWE debuts as heels when they interfered during the NXT Women's Championship match, in which they helped Shayna Baszler regain the title over Kairi Sane. They made another appearance at NXT TakeOver: WarGames, when they interfered during Baszler and Sane's two out of three falls match, in which Baszler scored the first fall and the victory in the latter to retain the title. On the December 19, 2018 episode of NXT, Shafir and Duke made their NXT in ring debut, but were defeated by Io Shirai and Dakota Kai, when Shirai pinned Shafir after a moonsault. At NXT TakeOver: Phoenix, Shafir and Duke assisted Baszler in retaining the title against Bianca Belair. In October 2019, Duke and Shafir were defeated by Kai and Tegan Nox in a number one contender's match for the Women's Tag Team Championship. After several months of inactivity, Shafir returned to WWE TV on August 17, 2020, reuniting with Baszler and Duke, and winning a Raw Underground match. On June 25, 2021, Shafir was released from her WWE contract.

Independent Circuit (2021)
On October 22, 2021, she defeated Masha Slamovich at Game Changer Wrestling Josh Barnett's Bloodsport 7. On the November 13, 2021 episode (taped October 7, 2021) of UWN Primetime Live Championship Wrestling from Georgia, she defeated Nightmare Factory alum, Brooke Havok.

All Elite Wrestling (2021–present)
On the December 14, 2021 episode of AEW Dark, Shafir made her All Elite Wrestling debut, where she was defeated by Kris Statlander. After going on a six match winning streak, on the April 22, 2022 episode of AEW Rampage, Shafir challenged Jade Cargill for the AEW TBS Championship in a losing effort. On June 8 on AEW Dynamite, Shafir faced Thunder Rosa for the AEW Women's World Championship which Shafir lost.

From June 2022, Shafir teamed with Nyla Rose. On the August 9 episode of AEW Dark, Vickie Guerrero, the manager of Rose, introduced Rose and Shafir as the Beasts of Burden. On the January 10, 2023, episode of Dark, Shafir challenged Athena for the ROH Women's World Championship, but was unsuccessful.

Personal life 
Shafir is a close friend of Ronda Rousey, who trained with her at Glendale Fighting Club, and had a similar background in judo. They lived together for a number of years in Venice, California, along with Shayna Baszler and Jessamyn Duke.

In December 2015, Shafir got engaged to professional wrestler Christopher Lindsey, better known as Roderick Strong. On April 24, 2017, Shafir gave birth to their first child, Troy Veniamin Lindsey. The two were married on November 7, 2018.

Shafir is Jewish.

Mixed martial arts record 

|-
|Loss
|align=center|1–2
|Amber Leibrock
|TKO (punches)
|Invicta FC 13: Cyborg vs. Van Duin
|
|align=center|1
|align=center|0:37
|Las Vegas, Nevada, United States
|
|-
|Loss
|align=center|1–1
|Amanda Bell
|KO (punches)
|LOP Chaos at the Casino 5
|
| style="text-align:center;"| 1
| style="text-align:center;"| 0:37
|Inglewood, California, United States
|
|-
|Win
|align=center|1–0
|Chandra Engel
|Submission (armbar)
|LOP Chaos at the Casino 4
|
|align=center|1
|align=center|1:57
|Inglewood, California, United States
|

|-
|Win
|align=center|5–0
|Nicole Upshaw
|Submission (armbar)
|U of MMA: Fight Night 5
|
|align=center|1
|align=center|1:53
|Los Angeles, California, United States
|
|-
|Win
|align=center|4–0
|Tabitha Patterson
|Submission (arm-triangle choke)
|Tuff-N-Uff: Future Stars of MMA
|
|align=center|1
|align=center|0:59
|Las Vegas, Nevada, United States
|
|-
|Win
|align=center|3–0
|Danielle Mack
|Submission (armbar)
|Tuff-N-Uff: Mayhem in Mesquite 2
|
|align=center|1
|align=center|0:59
|Mesquite, Nevada, United States
|
|-
|Win
|align=center|2–0
|Becky Lewis
|Submission (armbar)
|Premier FC 12: Premier Fighting Championship 12
|
|align=center|1
|align=center|2:03
|Albany, New York, United States
|
|-
|Win
|align=center|1–0
|Denise Goddard
|Submission (armbar)
|Premier FC 9: Battle to the Belt
|
|align=center|1
|align=center|0:44
|Holyoke, Massachusetts, United States
|

References

External links 

 
 
 

Living people
1988 births
Moldovan female professional wrestlers
Moldovan female mixed martial artists
Featherweight mixed martial artists
Mixed martial artists utilizing judo
Jewish Moldovan sportspeople
Jewish professional wrestlers
Jewish martial artists
Moldovan female judoka
21st-century professional wrestlers
All Elite Wrestling personnel